PLAY - Portuguese Music Awards (pt: PLAY - Prémios da Música Portuguesa) are annual awards for the Portuguese music scene, sponsored by Vodafone. 

The first edition took place at Coliseu dos Recreios in Lisbon on 9 April 2019 and was broadcast by RTP, presented by Filomena Cautela and Inês Lopes Gonçalves.

Editions

Categories

Active 

 Vodafone Best Song (2019–)
 Best Female Artist (2020–)
 Best Male Artist (2020–)
 Best Group (2019–)
 Best Album (2019–)
 Best Fado Album (2019–)
 Best Jazz Album (2020–)
 Best Classical/Erudite Music Album (2020–)
 Best Videoclip (2019–)
 Revelation of the Year (2019–)
 Lusophony Award (2019–)
 Critics Award (2019–)
 Career Award (2019–)

Extinct 

 Best Solo Artist (2019)
 Best International Artist (2019)
 Best International Song (2019)

Active categories winners

Vodafone Best Song 
This award is voted by the public via internet and phonecalls.

Best Female Artist

Best Male Artist

Best Group

Best Album

Best Fado Album

Best Jazz Album

Best Classical/Erudite Music Album

Best Videoclip

Revelation of the Year

Lusophony Award

Critics Award

Career Award

Extinct categories winners

Best Solo Artist

Best International Artist

Best International Song

References 

Awards established in 2019
Portuguese music
Portuguese awards
Portuguese music awards